Cristian Ruben Spachuck, commonly known as Ruben Spachuck (born 14 February 1981), is an Argentine-born Portuguese rugby union footballer. He played as a prop.

He was one of the four Belenenses players at the 2007 Rugby World Cup finals. He moved to the French team of Blagnac after the tournament, where he played in 2007/08. He also would play for FC Auch Gers, in 2008/09, US Colomiers, from 2009/10 to 2010/11, and CS Bourgoin-Jallieu, where he played from 2011/12 to 2016/17, when he finished his career.

He had 47 caps for Portugal, from 2005 to 2014, with 2 tries scored, 10 points on aggregate. Spachuck's first game for Portugal came on 5 February 2005, against Georgia, in an 18-14 win. He played in all the four games of Portugal at the 2007 Rugby World Cup, without scoring. He had his last game on 8 March 2014, in a 34-18 defeat to Russia, in Sochi, aged 33 years old, in a 2015 Rugby World Cup qualifier.

International Statistics
Ruben Spachuck International Statistics

References

1981 births
Living people
Argentine rugby union players
Portuguese rugby union players
Rugby union props
Portuguese expatriate rugby union players
Expatriate rugby union players in France
Portuguese expatriate sportspeople in France
Argentine emigrants to Portugal
CS Bourgoin-Jallieu players
Portugal international rugby union players